Eupithecia elimata is a moth in the family Geometridae first described by Karl Dietze in 1906. It is found in Algeria.

References

Moths described in 1906
elimata
Moths of Africa